The Slavic languages, also known as the Slavonic languages, are Indo-European languages spoken primarily by the Slavic peoples and their descendants. They are thought to descend from a proto-language called Proto-Slavic, spoken during the Early Middle Ages, which in turn is thought to have descended from the earlier Proto-Balto-Slavic language, linking the Slavic languages to the Baltic languages in a Balto-Slavic group within the Indo-European family.

The Slavic languages are conventionally (that is, also on the basis of extralinguistic features) divided into three subgroups: East, South, and West, which together constitute more than 20 languages. Of these, 10 have at least one million speakers and official status as the national languages of the countries in which they are predominantly spoken: Russian, Belarusian and Ukrainian (of the East group), Polish, Czech and Slovak (of the West group) and Bulgarian and Macedonian (eastern dialects of the South group), and Serbo-Croatian and Slovene (western dialects of the South group). In addition, Aleksandr Dulichenko recognizes a number of Slavic microlanguages: both isolated ethnolects and peripheral dialects of more well-established Slavic languages.

Slavic languages are highly fusional and, with some exceptions, have richly developed inflection and cases. The word order of the Slavic languages languages is mostly free.

The current geographical distribution of natively spoken Slavic languages includes the Balkans, Central and Eastern Europe, and all the way from Western Siberia to the Russian Far East. Furthermore, the diasporas of many Slavic peoples have established isolated minorities of speakers of their languages all over the world. The number of speakers of all Slavic languages together was estimated to be 315 million at the turn of the twenty-first century. It is the largest ethno-linguistic group in Europe.

Branches

Since the interwar period, scholars have conventionally divided Slavic languages, on the basis of geographical and genealogical principle, and with the use of the extralinguistic feature of script, into three main branches, that is, East, South, and West (from the vantage of linguistic features alone, there are only two branches of the Slavic languages, namely North and South). These three conventional branches feature some of the following sub-branches:

 East Slavic
 Belarusian
 Podlachian (often seen as a dialect of Belarusian or Ukrainian)
 Russian
 Rusyn (seen as Ukrainian dialect by Ukrainian cultural officials)
 Ukrainian
 West Polesian
 South Slavic
 Eastern
 Bulgarian
 Macedonian
 Old Church Slavonic
 Western
 Serbo-Croatian
 Serbian
 Croatian
 Bosnian
 Montenegrin
 Slovene

 West Slavic
 Czech–Slovak
 Czech
 Slovak
 Lechitic
 Polabian
 Polish 
 Pomeranian
 Kashubian
 Silesian (often seen as a dialect of Polish)
 Sorbian
 Lower Sorbian
 Upper Sorbian

Some linguists speculate that a North Slavic branch has existed as well. The Old Novgorod dialect may have reflected some idiosyncrasies of this group.

Mutual intelligibility also plays a role in determining the West, East, and South branches. Speakers of languages within the same branch will in most cases be able to understand each other at least partially, but they are generally unable to across branches (which would be comparable to a native English speaker trying to understand any other Germanic languages besides Scots).

The most obvious differences between the East, South, and West Slavic branches are in the orthography of the standard languages: West Slavic languages (and Western South Slavic languages – Croatian and Slovene) are written in the Latin script, and have had more Western European influence due to their proximity and speakers being historically Roman Catholic, whereas the East Slavic and Eastern South Slavic languages are written in Cyrillic and, with Eastern Orthodox or Uniate faith, have had more Greek influence. Two Slavic languages, Belarusian and Serbian, are biscriptal, commonly written in either alphabet. East Slavic languages such as Russian have, however, during and after Peter the Great's Europeanization campaign, absorbed many words of Latin, French, German, and Italian origin.

The tripartite division of the Slavic languages does not take into account the spoken dialects of each language. Of these, certain so-called transitional dialects and hybrid dialects often bridge the gaps between different languages, showing similarities that do not stand out when comparing Slavic literary (i.e. standard) languages. For example, Slovak (West Slavic) and Ukrainian (East Slavic) are bridged by the Rusyn language/dialect of Eastern Slovakia and Western Ukraine. Similarly, the Croatian Kajkavian dialect is more similar to Slovene than to the standard Croatian language.

Although the Slavic languages diverged from a common proto-language later than any other groups of the Indo-European language family, enough differences exist between the various Slavic dialects and languages to make communication between speakers of different Slavic languages difficult. Within the individual Slavic languages, dialects may vary to a lesser degree, as those of Russian, or to a much greater degree, like those of Slovene.

History

Common roots and ancestry

Slavic languages descend from Proto-Slavic, their immediate parent language, ultimately deriving from Proto-Indo-European, the ancestor language of all Indo-European languages, via a Proto-Balto-Slavic stage. During the Proto-Balto-Slavic period a number of exclusive isoglosses in phonology, morphology, lexis, and syntax developed, which makes Slavic and Baltic the closest related of all the Indo-European branches. The secession of the Balto-Slavic dialect ancestral to Proto-Slavic is estimated on archaeological and glottochronological criteria to have occurred sometime in the period 1500–1000 BCE.

A minority of Baltists maintain the view that the Slavic group of languages differs so radically from the neighboring Baltic group (Lithuanian, Latvian, and the now-extinct Old Prussian), that they could not have shared a parent language after the breakup of the Proto-Indo-European continuum about five millennia ago. Substantial advances in Balto-Slavic accentology that occurred in the last three decades, however, make this view very hard to maintain nowadays, especially when one considers that there was most likely no "Proto-Baltic" language and that West Baltic and East Baltic differ from each other as much as each of them does from Proto-Slavic.

Evolution

The imposition of Old Church Slavonic on Orthodox Slavs was often at the expense of the vernacular. Says WB Lockwood, a prominent Indo-European linguist, "It (O.C.S) remained in use to modern times but was more and more influenced by the living, evolving languages, so that one distinguishes Bulgarian, Serbian, and Russian varieties. The use of such media hampered the development of the local languages for literary purposes, and when they do appear the first attempts are usually in an artificially mixed style." (148)

Lockwood also notes that these languages have "enriched" themselves by drawing on Church Slavonic for the vocabulary of abstract concepts. The situation in the Catholic countries, where Latin was more important, was different. The Polish Renaissance poet Jan Kochanowski and the Croatian Baroque writers of the 16th century all wrote in their respective vernaculars (though Polish itself had drawn amply on Latin in the same way Russian would eventually draw on Church Slavonic).

Although Church Slavonic hampered vernacular literatures, it fostered Slavonic literary activity and abetted linguistic independence from external influences. Only the Croatian vernacular literary tradition nearly matches Church Slavonic in age. It began with the Vinodol Codex and continued through the Renaissance until the codifications of Croatian in 1830, though much of the literature between 1300 and 1500 was written in much the same mixture of the vernacular and Church Slavonic as prevailed in Russia and elsewhere.

The most important early monument of Croatian literacy is the Baška tablet from the late 11th century. It is a large stone tablet found in the small Church of St. Lucy, Jurandvor on the Croatian island of Krk, containing text written mostly in Čakavian dialect in angular Croatian Glagolitic script. The independence of Dubrovnik facilitated the continuity of the tradition.

More recent foreign influences follow the same general pattern in Slavic languages as elsewhere and are governed by the political relationships of the Slavs. In the 17th century, bourgeois Russian (delovoi jazyk) absorbed German words through direct contacts between Russians and communities of German settlers in Russia. In the era of Peter the Great, close contacts with France invited countless loan words and calques from French, many of which not only survived but also replaced older Slavonic loans. In the 19th century, Russian influenced most literary Slavic languages by one means or another.

Differentiation
The Proto-Slavic language existed until around AD 500. By the 7th century, it had broken apart into large dialectal zones.

There are no reliable hypotheses about the nature of the subsequent breakups of West and South Slavic. East Slavic is generally thought to converge to one Old East Slavic language, which existed until at least the 12th century.

Linguistic differentiation was accelerated by the dispersion of the Slavic peoples over a large territory, which in Central Europe exceeded the current extent of Slavic-speaking majorities. Written documents of the 9th, 10th, and 11th centuries already display some local linguistic features. For example, the Freising manuscripts show a language that contains some phonetic and lexical elements peculiar to Slovene dialects (e.g. rhotacism, the word krilatec). The Freising manuscripts are the first Latin-script continuous text in a Slavic language.

The migration of Slavic speakers into the Balkans in the declining centuries of the Byzantine Empire expanded the area of Slavic speech, but the pre-existing writing (notably Greek) survived in this area. The arrival of the Hungarians in Pannonia in the 9th century interposed non-Slavic speakers between South and West Slavs. Frankish conquests completed the geographical separation between these two groups, also severing the connection between Slavs in Moravia and Lower Austria (Moravians) and those in present-day Styria, Carinthia, East Tyrol in Austria, and in the provinces of modern Slovenia, where the ancestors of the Slovenes settled during first colonisation.

In September 2015, Alexei Kassian and Anna Dybo published, as a part of interdisciplinary study of Slavic ethnogenesis, a lexicostatistical classification of Slavic languages. It was built using qualitative 110-word Swadesh lists that were compiled according to the standards of the Global Lexicostatistical Database project and processed using modern phylogenetic algorithms.

The resulting dated tree complies with the traditional expert views on the Slavic group structure. Kassian-Dybo's tree suggests that Proto-Slavic first diverged into three branches: Eastern, Western and Southern. The Proto-Slavic break-up is dated to around 100 A.D., which correlates with the archaeological assessment of Slavic population in the early 1st millennium A.D. being spread on a large territory and already not being monolithic. Then, in the 5th and 6th centuries A.D., these three Slavic branches almost simultaneously divided into sub-branches, which corresponds to the fast spread of the Slavs through Eastern Europe and the Balkans during the second half of the 1st millennium A.D. (the so-called Slavicization of Europe).

The Slovenian language was excluded from the analysis, as both Ljubljana koine and Literary Slovenian show mixed lexical features of Southern and Western Slavic languages (which could possibly indicate the Western Slavic origin of Slovenian, which for a long time was being influenced on the part of the neighboring Serbo-Croatian dialects), and the quality Swadesh lists were not yet collected for Slovenian dialects. Because of scarcity or unreliability of data, the study also did not cover the so-called Old Novgordian dialect, the Polabian language and some other Slavic lects.

The above Kassian-Dybo's research did not take into account the findings by Russian linguist Andrey Zaliznyak who stated that, until the 14th or 15th century, major language differences were not between the regions occupied by modern Belarus, Russia and Ukraine, but rather between the north-west (around modern Velikiy Novgorod and Pskov) and the center (around modern Kyiv, Suzdal, Rostov, Moscow as well as Belarus) of the East Slavic territories. Old Novgorodian dialect of that time differed from the central East Slavic dialects as well as from all other Slavic languages much more than in later centuries. According to Zaliznyak, the Russian language developed as a convergence of that dialect and the central ones, whereas Ukrainian and Belorusian were continuation of development of the central dialects of East Slavs.

Also Russian linguist Sergey Nikolaev, analysing historical development of Slavic dialects’ accent system, concluded that a number of other tribes in Kievan Rus came from different Slavic branches and spoke distant Slavic dialects.

Zaliznyak and Nikolaev's points mean that there was a convergence stage before the divergence or simultaneously, which was not taken into consideration by Kassian-Dybo's research.

Ukrainian linguists (Stepan Smal-Stotsky, Ivan Ohienko, George Shevelov, Yevhen Tymchenko, Vsevolod Hantsov, Olena Kurylo) deny the existence of a common Old East Slavic language at any time in the past. According to them, the dialects of East Slavic tribes evolved gradually from the common Proto-Slavic language without any intermediate stages.

Linguistic history

The following is a summary of the main changes from Proto-Indo-European (PIE) leading up to the Common Slavic (CS) period immediately following the Proto-Slavic language (PS).

 Satemisation:
 PIE *ḱ, *ǵ, *ǵʰ → *ś, *ź, *źʰ (→ CS *s, *z, *z)
 PIE *kʷ, *gʷ, *gʷʰ → *k, *g, *gʰ
 Ruki rule: Following *r, *u, *k or *i, PIE *s → *š (→ CS *x)
 Loss of voiced aspirates: PIE *bʰ, *dʰ, *gʰ → *b, *d, *g
 Merger of *o and *a: PIE *a/*o, *ā/*ō → PS *a, *ā (→ CS *o, *a)
 Law of open syllables: All closed syllables (syllables ending in a consonant) are eventually eliminated, in the following stages:
 Nasalization: With *N indicating either *n or *m not immediately followed by a vowel: PIE *aN, *eN, *iN, *oN, *uN → *ą, *ę, *į, *ǫ, *ų (→ CS *ǫ, *ę, *ę, *ǫ, *y). (NOTE: *ą *ę etc. indicates a nasalized vowel.)
 In a cluster of obstruent (stop or fricative) + another consonant, the obstruent is deleted unless the cluster can occur word-initially.
 (occurs later, see below) Monophthongization of diphthongs.
 (occurs much later, see below) Elimination of liquid diphthongs (e.g. *er, *ol when not followed immediately by a vowel).
 Iotation: Consonants are palatalized by an immediately following *j:
 sj, *zj → CS *š, *ž
 nj, *lj, *rj → CS *ň, *ľ, *ř (pronounced  or similar)
 tj, *dj → CS *ť, *ď (probably palatal stops, e.g. , but developing in different ways depending on the language)
 bj, *pj, *mj, *wj → *bľ, *pľ, *mľ, *wľ (the lateral consonant *ľ is mostly lost later on in West Slavic)
 Vowel fronting: After *j or some other palatal sound, back vowels are fronted (*a, *ā, *u, *ū, *ai, *au → *e, *ē, *i, *ī, *ei, *eu). This leads to hard/soft alternations in noun and adjective declensions.
 Prothesis: Before a word-initial vowel, *j or *w is usually inserted.
 Monophthongization: *ai, *au, *ei, *eu, *ū → *ē, *ū, *ī, *jū, *ȳ 
 Second palatalization: *k, *g, *x → CS *c , *dz, *ś before new *ē (from earlier *ai). *ś later splits into *š (West Slavic), *s (East/South Slavic).
 Progressive palatalization (or "third palatalization"): *k, *g, *x → CS *c, *dz, *ś after *i, *ī in certain circumstances.
 Vowel quality shifts: All pairs of long/short vowels become differentiated as well by vowel quality:
 a, *ā → CS *o, *a
 i, *u → CS *ь, *ъ (also written *ĭ, *ŭ; lax vowels as in the English words pit, put)
 ī, *ū, *ȳ → CS *i, *u, *y
 Elimination of liquid diphthongs: Liquid diphthongs (sequences of vowel plus *l or *r, when not immediately followed by a vowel) are changed so that the syllable becomes open:
 or, *ol, *er, *el → *ro, *lo, *re, *le in West Slavic.
 or, *ol, *er, *el → *oro, *olo, *ere, *olo in East Slavic.
 or, *ol, *er, *el → *rā, *lā, *re, *le in South Slavic.
 Possibly, *ur, *ul, *ir, *il → syllabic *r, *l, *ř, *ľ (then develops in divergent ways).
 Development of phonemic tone and vowel length (independent of vowel quality): Complex developments (see History of accentual developments in Slavic languages).

Features
The Slavic languages are a relatively homogeneous family, compared with other families of Indo-European languages (e.g. Germanic, Romance, and Indo-Iranian). As late as the 10th century AD, the entire Slavic-speaking area still functioned as a single, dialectally differentiated language, termed Common Slavic. Compared with most other Indo-European languages, the Slavic languages are quite conservative, particularly in terms of morphology (the means of inflecting nouns and verbs to indicate grammatical differences). Most Slavic languages have a rich, fusional morphology that conserves much of the inflectional morphology of Proto-Indo-European. The vocabulary of the Slavic languages is also of Indo-European origin. Many of its elements, which do not find exact matches in the ancient Indo-European languages, are associated with the Balto-Slavic community.

Consonants
The following table shows the inventory of consonants of Late Common Slavic:

This inventory of sounds is quite similar to what is found in most modern Slavic languages. The extensive series of palatal consonants, along with the affricates *ts and *dz, developed through a series of palatalizations that happened during the Proto-Slavic period, from earlier sequences either of velar consonants followed by front vowels (e.g. *ke, *ki, *ge, *gi, *xe, and *xi), or of various consonants followed by *j (e.g. *tj, *dj, *sj, *zj, *rj, *lj, *kj, and *gj, where *j is the palatal approximant (the sound of the English letter "y" in "yes" or "you").

The biggest change in this inventory results from a further general palatalization occurring near the end of the Common Slavic period, where all consonants became palatalized before front vowels. This produced a large number of new palatalized (or "soft") sounds, which formed pairs with the corresponding non-palatalized (or "hard") consonants and absorbed the existing palatalized sounds . These sounds were best preserved in Russian but were lost to varying degrees in other languages (particularly Czech and Slovak). The following table shows the inventory of modern Russian:

This general process of palatalization did not occur in Serbo-Croatian and Slovenian. As a result, the modern consonant inventory of these languages is nearly identical to the Late Common Slavic inventory.

Late Common Slavic tolerated relatively few consonant clusters. However, as a result of the loss of certain formerly present vowels (the weak yers),

Vowels
A typical vowel inventory is as follows:

The sound  occurs only in some languages (Russian and Belarusian), and even in these languages, it is unclear whether it is its own phoneme or an allophone of /i/. Nonetheless, it is a quite prominent and noticeable characteristic of the languages in which it is present.
 Russian   and Polish   "mouse"

Common Slavic also had two nasal vowels: *ę  and *ǫ . However, these are preserved only in modern Polish (along with a few lesser-known dialects and microlanguages; see Yus for more details).
 Polish   and   "snake, snakes"

Other phonemic vowels are found in certain languages (e.g. the schwa  in Bulgarian and Slovenian, distinct high-mid and low-mid vowels in Slovenian, and the lax front vowel  in Ukrainian).

Length, accent, and tone
An area of great difference among Slavic languages is that of prosody (i.e. syllabic distinctions such as vowel length, accent, and tone). Common Slavic had a complex system of prosody, inherited with little change from Proto-Indo-European. This consisted of phonemic vowel length and a free, mobile pitch accent:
 All vowels could occur either short or long, and this was phonemic (it could not automatically be predicted from other properties of the word).
 There was (at most) a single accented syllable per word, distinguished by higher pitch (as in modern Japanese) rather than greater dynamic stress (as in English).
 Vowels in accented syllables could be pronounced with either a rising or falling tone (i.e. there was pitch accent), and this was phonemic.
 The accent was free in that it could occur on any syllable and was phonemic.
 The accent was mobile in that its position could potentially vary among closely related words within a single paradigm (e.g. the accent might land on a different syllable between the nominative and genitive singular of a given word).
 Even within a given inflectional class (e.g. masculine i-stem nouns), there were multiple accent patterns in which a given word could be inflected. For example, most nouns in a particular inflectional class could follow one of three possible patterns: Either there was a consistent accent on the root (pattern A), predominant accent on the ending (pattern B), or accent that moved between the root and ending (pattern C). In patterns B and C, the accent in different parts of the paradigm shifted not only in location but also type (rising vs. falling). Each inflectional class had its own version of patterns B and C, which might differ significantly from one inflectional class to another.

The modern languages vary greatly in the extent to which they preserve this system. On one extreme, Serbo-Croatian preserves the system nearly unchanged (even more so in the conservative Chakavian dialect); on the other, Macedonian has basically lost the system in its entirety. Between them are found numerous variations:
 Slovenian preserves most of the system but has shortened all unaccented syllables and lengthened non-final accented syllables so that vowel length and accent position largely co-occur.
 Russian and Bulgarian have eliminated distinctive vowel length and tone and converted the accent into a stress accent (as in English) but preserved its position. As a result, the complexity of the mobile accent and the multiple accent patterns still exists (particularly in Russian because it has preserved the Common Slavic noun inflections, while Bulgarian has lost them).
 Czech and Slovak have preserved phonemic vowel length and converted the distinctive tone of accented syllables into length distinctions. The phonemic accent is otherwise lost, but the former accent patterns are echoed to some extent in corresponding patterns of vowel length/shortness in the root. Paradigms with mobile vowel length/shortness do exist but only in a limited fashion, usually only with the zero-ending forms (nom. sg., acc. sg., and/or gen. pl., depending on inflectional class) having a different length from the other forms. (Czech has a couple of other "mobile" patterns, but they are rare and can usually be substituted with one of the "normal" mobile patterns or a non-mobile pattern.)
 Old Polish had a system very much like Czech. Modern Polish has lost vowel length, but some former short-long pairs have become distinguished by quality (e.g.  > ), with the result that some words have vowel-quality changes that exactly mirror the mobile-length patterns in Czech and Slovak.

Grammar

Similarly, Slavic languages have extensive morphophonemic alternations in their derivational and inflectional morphology, including between velar and postalveolar consonants, front and back vowels, and a vowel and no vowel.

Selected cognates

The following is a very brief selection of cognates in basic vocabulary across the Slavic language family, which may serve to give an idea of the sound changes involved. This is not a list of translations: cognates have a common origin, but their meaning may be shifted and loanwords may have replaced them.

Influence on neighboring languages

Most languages of the former Soviet Union and of some neighbouring countries (for example, Mongolian) are significantly influenced by Russian, especially in vocabulary. The Romanian, Albanian, and Hungarian languages show the influence of the neighboring Slavic nations, especially in vocabulary pertaining to urban life, agriculture, and crafts and trade—the major cultural innovations at times of limited long-range cultural contact. In each one of these languages, Slavic lexical borrowings represent at least 15% of the total vocabulary. This is potentially because Slavic tribes crossed and partially settled the territories inhabited by ancient Illyrians and Vlachs on their way to the Balkans.

Germanic languages 
Max Vasmer, a specialist in Slavic etymology, has claimed that there were no Slavic loans into Proto-Germanic. However, there are isolated Slavic loans (mostly recent) into other Germanic languages. For example, the word for "border" (in modern German , Dutch ) was borrowed from the Common Slavic . There are, however, many cities and villages of Slavic origin in Eastern Germany, the largest of which are Berlin, Leipzig and Dresden. English derives quark (a kind of cheese and subatomic particle) from the German , which in turn is derived from the Slavic , which means "curd". Many German surnames, particularly in Eastern Germany and Austria, are Slavic in origin. The Nordic languages also have /torv (market place) from Old Russian  or Polish ,  (hops),
/reke/reje (shrimp, prawn),
and, via Middle Low German  (interpreter) from Old Slavic , and /pram (barge) from West Slavonic .

Finnic languages 
Finnic and Slavic languages have many words in common. According to Petri Kallio, this suggests Slavic words being borrowed into Finnish languages, as early as Proto-Finnic. Many loanwords have acquired a Finnicized form, making it difficult to say whether such a word is natively Finnic or Slavic.

Other 
The Czech word  is now found in most languages worldwide, and the word pistol, probably also from Czech, is found in many European languages.

A well-known Slavic word in almost all European languages is vodka, a borrowing from Russian  – which itself was borrowed from Polish  (lit. "little water"), from common Slavic  ("water", cognate to the English word) with the diminutive ending "". Owing to the medieval fur trade with Northern Russia, Pan-European loans from Russian include such familiar words as sable. The English word "vampire" was borrowed (perhaps via French ) from German , in turn derived from Serbo-Croatian , continuing Proto-Slavic , although Polish scholar K. Stachowski has argued that the origin of the word is early Slavic , going back to Turkic .

Several European languages, including English, have borrowed the word  (meaning "large, flat plain") directly from the former Yugoslav languages (i.e. Slovene and Serbo-Croatian). During the heyday of the USSR in the 20th century, many more Russian words became known worldwide: , Soviet, etc. "self-boiling").

Detailed list
The following tree for the Slavic languages derives from the Ethnologue report for Slavic languages. It includes the ISO 639-1 and ISO 639-3 codes where available.

East Slavic languages:
 Belarusian: ISO 639-1 code: be; ISO 639-3 code: bel
 Russian: ISO 639-1 code: ru; ISO 639-3 code: rus
 Rusyn: ISO 639-3 code: rue
 Ruthenian: ISO 639-3 code: rsk
 Ukrainian: ISO 639-1 code: uk; ISO 639-3 code: ukr

South Slavic languages:
 Western South Slavic languages
 Bosnian: ISO 639-1 code: bs; ISO 639-3 code: bos
 Chakavian: ISO 639-3 code: ckm
 Croatian: ISO 639-1 code: hr; ISO 639-3 code: hrv
 Montenegrin: ISO 639-3 code: cnr
 Serbian: ISO 639-1 code: sr; ISO 639-3 code: srp
 Slavomolisano: ISO 639-3 code: svm
 Slovene: ISO 639-1 code: sl; ISO 639-3 code: slv
 Eastern South Slavic languages
 Bulgarian: ISO 639-1 code: bg; ISO 639-3 code: bul
 Church Slavonic: ISO 639-1 code: cu; ISO 639-3 code: chu
 Macedonian: ISO 639-1 code: mk; ISO 639-3 code: mkd

West Slavic languages:
 Sorbian languages
 Lower Sorbian (also known as Lusatian): ISO 639-3 code: dsb
 Upper Sorbian: ISO 639-3 code: hsb
 Lechitic languages
 Kashubian: ISO 639-3 code: csb
 Polish: ISO 639-1 code: pl; ISO 639-3 code: pol
 Silesian: ISO 639-3 code: szl
 Czech–Slovak languages
 Czech: ISO 639-1 code: cs; ISO 639-3 ces
 Slovak: ISO 639-1 code: sk; ISO 639-3 code: slk

Para- and supranational languages
 Church Slavonic language, variations of Old Church Slavonic with significant replacement of the original vocabulary by forms from the Old East Slavic and other regional forms. The Bulgarian Orthodox Church, Russian Orthodox Church, Polish Orthodox Church, Macedonian Orthodox Church, Serbian Orthodox Church, and even some Roman Catholic Churches in Croatia continue to use Church Slavonic as a liturgical language. While not used in modern times, the text of a Church Slavonic Roman Rite Mass survives in Croatia and the Czech Republic, which is best known through Janáček's musical setting of it (the Glagolitic Mass).
 Interslavic language, a modernized and simplified form of Old Church Slavonic, largely based on material that the modern Slavic languages have in common. Its purpose is to facilitate communication between representatives of different Slavic nations and to allow people who do not know any Slavic language to communicate with Slavs. Because Old Church Slavonic had become too archaic and complex for everyday communication, Pan-Slavic language projects have been created from the 17th century onwards in order to provide the Slavs with a common literary language. Interslavic in its current form was standardized in 2011 after the merger of several older projects.

See also
 Language family
 List of Slavic studies journals
 Outline of Slavic history and culture
 Slavic microlanguages
 Slavic names
 Slavic studies

Notes

Citations

References

General references 

 Lockwood, W.B. A Panorama of Indo-European Languages. Hutchinson University Library, 1972.  hardback,  paperback.
 Marko Jesensek, The Slovene Language in the Alpine and Pannonian Language Area, 2005.

External links

 Slavic dictionaries on Slavic Net 
 Slavistik-Portal The Slavistics Portal (Germany)
 

 
Fusional languages
Indo-European languages